Silent Miracles was an EP released in 1996 by the German power metal band Gamma Ray following the release of their album Land of the Free.

Track listing
 "Miracle" - 7:18 (Hansen / Hansen)
 "Farewell" - 5:10 (Schlächter / Schlächter)
 "The Silence" - 6:30 (Hansen / Hansen)
 "A While In Dreamland" - 4:18 (Schlächter / Hansen)

 "Miracle" is a slow and epic version of "Man On a Mission" from Land of the Free
 "Farewell" also appears on the album Land of the Free.

Lineup
 Kai Hansen - vocals, guitar
 Dirk Schlächter - guitar
 Jan Rubach - bass
 Thomas Nack - drums

Gamma Ray (band) albums
1996 EPs
Albums produced by Kai Hansen